Lancha Plana (Spanish for "Flat Boat") was a small settlement in Amador County, California, formed as a result of a flatboat ferry crossing across the Mokelumne River.

History
It was founded by Mexican miners in 1848.  The remnants of the town were submerged as a result of the damming of the river to form the Camanche Reservoir. Lancha Plana Bridge crosses the lake now about where the town once stood. It was briefly known as "Sonora Bar", as most miners were from Sonora.

Lancha Plana is registered as a California Historical Landmark.

A post office operated at Lancha Plana from 1859 to 1919, with a closure from 1912 to 1913.

Geography

References

Former settlements in Amador County, California
Mokelumne River
Destroyed towns
Submerged settlements in the United States
California Historical Landmarks
Populated places established in 1849
1849 establishments in California
Former populated places in California